What The Crow Brings is the first full-length studio album by American indie folk band the Low Anthem, self-released on September 21, 2007. With the release of this album the band embraced a full-fledged DIY ideology; writing, recording, mixing, and even painting and silk screening the record jackets from their Providence, Rhode Island, apartment.

Track listing
"The Ballad of the Broken Bones" - 3:58
"Yellowed by the Sun" - 3:26
"As the Flame Burns Down" - 4:58
"Bless Your Tombstone Heart" - 4:05
"This God Damn House" - 3:38
"A Weary Horse Can Hide the Pain" - 4:15
"Scavenger Bird" - 4:46
"Sawdust Saloon" - 7:04
"Keep on the Sunny Side" - 3:09
"Senorita" - 4:33
"Coal Mountain Lullaby" - 3:02

References

2007 albums
Self-released albums
The Low Anthem albums